Joseph or Joe Parker may refer to:

 Joseph Parker (theologian) (1830–1902), English Nonconformist divine
 Joseph Parker (cricketer) (born 1976), English cricketer
 Brooks Parker (Joseph Brooks Bloodgood Parker, 1889–1951), American Olympic fencer
 Joseph Parker (boxer) (born 1992), New Zealand boxer
 Joseph Parker (athlete) (born 1978), Paralympic athlete
 Joseph Parker Jr. (1916–2012), American doctor
 Joseph Parker (mining engineer) (1871–1940), Scottish mining engineer and educator
 Joe Parker (athletic director), American sports executive
 Joe Parker (football manager), Scottish football manager
 Joe Parker (footballer) (born 1995), English footballer
 Joe Parker (comedian), South African comedian